s-CRY-ed, also known as s.CRY.ed or Scryed, is a 26 episode Japanese anime television series. It is produced by Sunrise, directed by Gorō Taniguchi and written by Yōsuke Kuroda. S-CRY-ed first aired in Japan on TV Tokyo and Animax. The series is set in an alternative time where in Kanagawa Prefecture a phenomenon granted a 1% of its people supernatural powers known as "Alters". The plot follows a young Alter mercenary known as Kazuma as well as Ryuho, a man working for the Alter special forces known as HOLY who become rivals as their areas clash.

In Japan, the series was released in 2001 between July 4 and December 26 for a total of twenty-six episodes. These were collected in a total of nine DVD volumes between November 25, 2001 and July 25, 2002. A DVD box containing all episodes was released on January 25, 2008 whereas a Blu-ray box was made available on October 26, 2011.

The anime was licensed by Bandai Entertainment in early 2003. Starting in 2003, Bandai released the show in North America as six individual Region 1 volumes, followed by a complete six-disc box set in November 2004. Bandai's European branch Beez Entertainment published the series in the United Kingdom. The release was in a total of six DVD volumes released between June 6, 2005 and February 27, 2006. Later, the series premiered on Cartoon Network's Adult Swim in the United States on May 29, 2005, after select episodes had been aired on Adult Swim's Video On Demand service for nearly a year. On September 27, 2005, Bandai re-released s-CRY-ed under the Anime Legends banner, in three two-disc volumes, followed by the Anime Legends Complete Collection on October 24, 2006. Following the 2012 closure of Bandai Entertainment, Sunrise announced at Otakon 2013, that Sentai Filmworks has rescued S-CRY-ed, along with a handful of other former BEI titles.

The music of S-CRY-ed was composed by Kōtarō Nakagawa. Its original soundtrack was released on November 21, 2001 whereas two drama CDs were released on December 19 of the same year. For the first twenty-five episodes the opening and ending are "Reckless Fire" by Yasuaki Ide and "Drastic My Soul" by Mikio Sakai, respectively. However, for episode twenty-six, "Reckless Fire" is replaced by "Drastic My Soul" whereas the ending theme is "Tabidachi no Kane ga Naru" ("The Bell of Setting out for a Journey Will Ring") by Mikio Sakai. There are also three insert song starting with "All I Need Is Love" by Sakai for episodes fourteen and seventeen, "Magma" by Ide for episode nineteen and "Discovery" by Sakai. Both the singles of "Reckless Fire" and "Drastic My Soul" were released on August 22, 2001.

Episodes list

Home media

References

Episodes
S-CRY-ed